Castel Boglione is a comune (municipality) in the Province of Asti in the Italian region Piedmont, located about  southeast of Turin and about  southeast of Asti.

Castel Boglione borders the following municipalities: Calamandrana, Castel Rocchero, Fontanile, Montabone, Nizza Monferrato, and Rocchetta Palafea.

References

External links
 Official website

Cities and towns in Piedmont